Artemida (until 1977 Loutsa) is an Eastern suburb of Athens. Since the 2011 local government reform it is part of the municipality Spata-Artemida, of which it is a municipal unit. The municipal unit has an area of 18.653 km2.

History
The city was named after the ancient goddess Artemis. The Temple of Artemis Brauron was among the most important sacred sites in the ancient times. Vravrona (or Brauron), about 20 km from Athens, was one of the 12 towns of Attica that was united to Athens by Theseus.
The ancient temple of Artemis is of Doric style and flourished in the 5th-4th century B.C. According to a myth, this is the temple where Iphigeneia was brought by her brother Orestes, when they met in the land of Tauris, where she served as a priestess in a local temple of Artemis. Iphigeneia had been transferred to Tauris by goddess Artemis herself, when she saved her from the sacrifice in Aulis. Returning to Greece, Iphigeneia brought with her a wooden statue of Artemis from Tauris.

Geography

Artemida is located on the Aegean Sea coast, in the eastern part of the Attica peninsula. It lies 5 km south of Rafina, 8 km east of Spata, 9 km north of Porto Rafti and 25 km east of Athens city centre. Greek National Road 85 (Rafina - Lavrio) passes through the town.

Historical population

See also
List of municipalities of Attica

References

External links
Greek Travel Pages

Spata-Artemida
Populated places in East Attica